Francesco da Urbino (1545–1582) was an Italian painter and artist.

Francesco was born in Urbino. He specialized in religious themed paintings. He died in 1582. One of his works can be found at the Art Institute of Chicago.

References

1545 births
16th-century Italian painters
Italian male painters
Umbrian painters
1582 deaths